The Robert F. and Elizabeth Clark House, located in Baker City, Oregon, is a house listed on the National Register of Historic Places.

See also
 National Register of Historic Places listings in Baker County, Oregon

References

External links
 

1880 establishments in Oregon
Buildings and structures in Baker City, Oregon
Houses completed in 1880
Houses in Baker County, Oregon
Houses on the National Register of Historic Places in Oregon
Italianate architecture in Oregon
National Register of Historic Places in Baker County, Oregon